The Valea Lată is a right tributary of the river Valea Largă in Romania. It flows into the Valea Largă in Viișoara.

References

Rivers of Romania
Rivers of Cluj County